Ian William Wrigglesworth, Baron Wrigglesworth of Norton-on-Tees (born 8 December 1939) is a Liberal Democrat peer.

Education 
He was born in Stockton-on-Tees, brought up in Norton-on-Tees, and educated at Stockton Grammar School, Stockton-Billingham Technical College, and the College of St Mark and St John, Chelsea.

Political career 
Between 1974 and 1981, Wrigglesworth was Labour and Co-operative Member of Parliament for Thornaby, during the county of Cleveland administration. He was one of the founder members of the Social Democratic Party (SDP) in 1981 and was subsequently elected SDP Member for Stockton South from 1983 until 1987, when he lost his seat.

In 1988, he became the first president of the Liberal Democrats and was chairman of the Liberal Democrat Trustees until February 2012, when he became national treasurer. 
 
Shortly after he was elected to Parliament, Wrigglesworth was a founder member of the Manifesto Group and with John Cartwright helped found the Campaign for Labour Victory under the leadership of Bill Rodgers. From 1974 to 1979, he was Parliamentary Private Secretary to the Home Secretary, the Rt Hon Roy Jenkins, and when Labour returned to Opposition in 1979, he was appointed Shadow Minister for the Civil Service by the Rt Hon James Callaghan. However, Wrigglesworth became increasingly disillusioned by the leftward direction the Labour Party was taking and became part of the nucleus of Labour MPs who contemplated leaving the party in 1979 and 1980. In 1981, Wrigglesworth became one of the founding members of the SDP and with Mike Thomas organised the launch of the new party in March 1981.

Wrigglesworth was one of only six SDP Members of Parliament to be returned to the House of Commons in the 1983 general election when he narrowly won the newly created constituency of Stockton South by 102 votes. In the 1987 general election, he was narrowly defeated by the Conservative candidate, Tim Devlin, by 774 votes.

After the merger of SDP and the Liberals, Wrigglesworth was elected the first president of the new Social and Liberal Democrats in 1988 and served a tumultuous two-year term as president, where he helped to guide the new party through a financial crisis, its disastrous showing in the 1989 European Parliamentary election and its change in name to the Liberal Democrats. Wrigglesworth was knighted in 1991 and, although he has been active in the business community in the North East since that time, he has retained his involvement with the Liberal Democrats. He was awarded an Honorary Doctorate of Music by the University of Northumbria in December 2011 and an Honorary Doctorate of Business Administration by the University of Teesside in October 2012.

At the Liberal Democrat Spring Conference 2012, held at The Sage Gateshead, it was announced that Sir Ian had taken up the post of treasurer of the party, which he held until December 2015.

Peerage 
It was announced that he would be elevated to the House of Lords in August 2013 and on 5 September 2013, he was created a life peer, as Baron Wrigglesworth, of Norton-on-Tees in the County of Durham.

Memberships 
Until February 2012, Wrigglesworth was deputy chairman of the Government's Regional Growth Fund Advisory Panel, which was chaired by Lord Heseltine and appointed by the government to consider bids. He is chairman of a Durham-based property company and was chairman of the Port of Tyne until August 2012. From 1995 to January 2009, he was the executive chairman of UK Land Estates and prior to that was executive deputy chairman of the Teesside-based Livingston Group and an executive director of its associate company Fairfield Industries. From 1996 until 2000, he was chairman of the public policy company, Prima Europe, and then chairman of its successor, GPC, after Prima was acquired by Omnicom. He has also been a non-executive director of a number of other private and public companies.

He was founder chairman of the NewcastleGateshead Initiative, the private/public sector partnership responsible for the destination marketing of Newcastle and Gateshead and its bid for European Capital of Culture 2008, which was won by Liverpool. From 2005 to 2009, he was the chairman of the Baltic Centre for Contemporary Art in Gateshead. Under his chairmanship the finances were restructured and the present caterers were appointed. His role was criticised for appointing controversial director Peter Doroshenko and stating that staff unrest against the director was a "storm in a teacup". A number of controversial exhibitions took place at that time. After Doroshenko's departure he was then responsible for the appointment of Godfrey Wordsdale, and discussions with the University of Northumbria were begun which led to the current partnership between the two institutions.

Prior to becoming a Member of Parliament, he worked in the City at National Giro Bank and began his working life in Middlesbrough at the Midland Bank. He is a former chairman of the Northern Region CBI and was founder chairman of the Northern Business Forum. Until 2002, he was deputy chairman of the governors of the University of Teesside (formerly Teesside Polytechnic).

Personal life
He is married to Tricia, who was a health visitor, and has two sons and a daughter.

References
One Northumberland Many Communities - Biographies...

External links 

|-

1939 births
Living people
Labour Co-operative MPs for English constituencies
Social Democratic Party (UK) MPs for English constituencies
Presidents of the Liberal Democrats (UK)
UK MPs 1974
UK MPs 1974–1979
UK MPs 1979–1983
UK MPs 1983–1987
People from Stockton-on-Tees
Knights Bachelor
Politicians awarded knighthoods
Liberal Democrats (UK) life peers
Alumni of Plymouth Marjon University
Life peers created by Elizabeth II